Nikos Polychronopoulos (born 24 March 1978) is a Greek professional Carom billiards player from Athens. In 1999, he won Junior UMB World Three-cushion Championship.

Titles 
Below is a list of major tournament finals contested by Polychronopoulos.
UMB World Junior Three-Cushion Championship
Winner: (1999)
Runner-up (1998)
 UMB World Three-cushion Championship for National Teams
Runner-up (2003)
 UMB World Three-cushion Championship 
Runner-up (2006)
 Three-Cushion World Cup
Runner-up (2008 - event 1, 2009 - event 3)
 UMB European Junior Three-cushion Championship
Winner (1999)
Runner-up (1998)
 
Runner-up (2002)

External links 

 The "Fast and Furious" Nikos Polychronopoulos. Video interview at Kozoom.com

References 

1978 births
Sportspeople from Athens
Living people
Greek carom billiards players